Vermont elected its members November 4, 1810.

See also 
 United States House of Representatives elections, 1810 and 1811
 List of United States representatives from Vermont

Notes 

1810
Vermont
United States House of Representatives